Oru Kudumba Chithram is a 2012 Indian Malayalam film, directed by Ramesh Thampi and produced by Kanakam Subair, Manu Sreekandapuram and Ramesh Kumar. The film stars Kalabhavan Mani, Lakshmi Sharma, Jagathy Sreekumar and Suraj Venjaramoodu in lead roles. The film's musical score was written by Anil Pongumoodu and Indrajith Ramesh.

Cast
 
Kalabhavan Mani as T.C. Arunagiri
Lakshmi Sharma as Mallika
Jagathy Sreekumar as Valiya Kurup
Suraj Venjaramoodu as Govardhanan
Kottayam Nazeer as Vakkeel
Jaffer Idukki
Bijukuttan as Purushu
Harishree Ashokan as Gopikuttan
Jayakrishnan
Manka Mahesh
Maya Moushmi 
Sajitha Betti as Nithya
Thalaivasal Vijay as Shanmukha Vel
Valsala Menon as Paatti
Athulya 
Lakshmi Sanal

Soundtrack
The music was composed by Anil Pongumoodu and Indrajith Ramesh.

References

2012 films
2010s Malayalam-language films